Events from the year 1941 in Taiwan, Empire of Japan.

Incumbents

Central government of Japan
 Prime Minister: Fumimaro Konoe, Hideki Tōjō

Taiwan
 Governor-General – Kiyoshi Hasegawa

Events

December
 15 December – The opening of Pingtung Line of Taiwan Railways Administration.
 17 December – The magnitude 7.1 Chungpu earthquake struck western Taiwan.

Births
 2 January – Tsay Jaw-yang, Minister of Transportation and Communications (1996–1998)
 20 February – Li Tai-hsiang, former composer and folk songwriter
 23 June – Tsai Hsun-hsiung, Taiwanese politician
 27 June – Wang Sing-nan, member of Legislative Yuan (1999–2012)
 9 August – Michael Tsai, Minister of National Defense (2008)
 20 August – Huang Chu-wen, Minister of the Interior (1998–2000)

References

 
Years of the 20th century in Taiwan